Melodi Grand Prix Junior, also spelled as MGPjr, is a Norwegian television song competition for aspiring singers between the ages of 8 and 15. The competing songs are written by the participants themselves and are sung primarily in Norwegian, and on several occasions, there were songs in Northern Sami, another language of Norway. Many past contestants went on to become stars, such as 2002's Nicolay Ramm, 2005's Malin Reitan, 2007's Celine Helgemo, 2009's Jørgen Dahl Moe, 2014's Mathea-Mari Glittenberg, and 2017's Oselie Henden.

History
The idea was taken from the Danish broadcaster Danmarks Radio, who launched a song contest for aspiring singers aged 8 to 15 in spring 2000. The format was a success and caught the attention of Norway and Sweden in 2002.

From 2003 to 2005, the contest used to select the Norwegian entry for the Junior Eurovision Song Contest (JESC). In 2006 Norway withdrew from the contest to participate in MGP Nordic and the contest used to select the entry for the Scandinavian counterpart until 2009. MGPjr is still held annually, but it's not used to select an entry for any contest. Shortly after Junior Eurovision 2021, NRK revealed that a delegation was sent to Paris to watch how much the contest evolved, raising questions about a possible return in 2022.

Only days after the 2022 edition of MGPjr ended, NRK announced changes to the format, thus putting the contest's future in jeopardy.

Presenters

 Thomas Numme (2002)
 Stian Barsnes-Simonsen (2002–08)
 Nadia Hasnaoui (2004–06)
  (2009–10)
  (2009)
  (2010, 2016)
 Margrethe Røed (2011–15) 
  (2011)
 Tooji (2012–14)
 Nicolay Ramm (2016–17)
  (2017–19)
  (2018–19)
  (2020-22)
  (2020-21)

Winners

See also
 MGP Junior, Denmark's national MGP competition
 Lilla Melodifestivalen, Sweden's national MGP competition
 Melodi Grand Prix Nordic, extinct pan-Scandinavian competition
 Junior Eurovision Song Contest, pan-European competition

References

 
Music festivals in Oslo
MGP Nordic
2002 Norwegian television series debuts
Junior Eurovision Song Contest